120 Days of Genitorture is the debut album of American industrial metal/industrial rock band Genitorturers. The title is a reference to the book "120 Days of Sodom", by the Marquis de Sade.

Track listing

Personnel 
 Gen – vocals
 Jerry Outlaw – guitars
 Sean Colpoys – bass
 AW Reckart – drums
Recorded at Wolfhead Studio – Altamonte Springs, FL
Mixed at Parc Studio – Altamonte Springs, FL
Produced by Nick Turner and Genitorturers
Released by Shock Therapy / IRS Records

References 

1993 debut albums
Genitorturers albums
Capitol Records albums